"Tunnel Vision" is a song recorded by American singer Justin Timberlake for his third studio album, The 20/20 Experience (2013). It was written and produced by Timberlake, Timothy "Timbaland" Mosley and Jerome "J-Roc" Harmon, with additional writing by James Fauntleroy. "Tunnel Vision" was digitally released on June 14, 2013 by RCA Records as the third single from the album. It is a mid-tempo R&B song with EDM influence and instrumentation featuring Timbaland's signature ad-libs, record-scratching, heavy drums, melodic bass, orchestration and synthesizer. Its lyrics proclaim Timberlake's tunnel vision for his love interest, with several voyeuristic references.

"Tunnel Vision" received generally positive reviews from music critics, most of whom praised Timbaland's production, and it was cited as The 20/20 Experiences highlight. After the album's release, the song charted in South Korea and the United States because of high digital sales. It debuted on the singles chart in South Korea at number 27, selling 6,670 digital copies in its first week. "Tunnel Vision" peaked at number 40 on the US Billboard Hot R&B/Hip-Hop Songs chart, and number eight on the UK R&B Singles Chart.

The music video for "Tunnel Vision" was directed by Jonathan Craven, Simon McLoughlin and Jeff Nicholas, and premiered on July 3 on Timberlake's Vevo channel. In the seven-minute video, Timberlake and Timbaland watch nude women and dance. Critics labeled the video NSFW and compared it to the video for Robin Thicke's 2013 single, "Blurred Lines". Originally banned on YouTube, it was later posted with the condition that viewers disclose their age. The song was part of the set list for Timberlake's 2013 Legends of the Summer concert tour with rapper Jay-Z and his fifth solo tour, the 2013–15 20/20 Experience World Tour.

Production and release 

"Tunnel Vision" was written by Justin Timberlake, Timothy "Timbaland" Mosley, Jerome "J-Roc" Harmon and James Fauntleroy, and produced by Timbaland, Timberlake and Harmon. Timberlake arranged and produced his vocals, which were recorded at Larabee Studios in North Hollywood, California. Other instrumentalists were Harmon on keyboards and Elliot Ives on guitar. The song was engineered by Chris Godbey (assisted by Alejandro Baima) and mixed by Jimmy Douglass, Godbey and Timberlake at Larabee Studios.

On June 10, 2013 Timberlake introduced the artwork for the "Tunnel Vision" single, a black-and-white close-up of the singer's face in the silhouette of a nude woman. Kia Macarechi of The Huffington Post found the artwork unpleasant and unusual; according to Justin Myers of the Official Charts Company, Timberlake "seems to be playing up to his naughty nickname of Trousersnake with the cover". Zach Dionne of New Yorks Vulture website called the cover "awful boobnose single art", committing to "the smoky naked woman vibe". "Tunnel Vision" and its radio edit were digitally released in France and Italy on June 14 on Amazon. That day, the single was also released in Australia, Belgium, Luxembourg, The Netherlands, New Zealand and Sweden on 7 Digital and the iTunes Store. It was released on June 17 in Norway, the following day in Spain and on June 21 in Switzerland.

Composition and lyrics 

"Tunnel Vision" is a mid-tempo R&B song with an EDM influence. Billboard'''s Jason Lipshutz noted that it has an instrumentation that features "fizzing beats abetted by the producer's [Timbaland] signature ad-libs and vocal record-scratches", while according to Sobhi Youssef of Sputnikmusic the song is built on "still-existing chops with a drum heavy, syncopated backbone amidst frenetically shifting bass melodies, sweeping orchestrations, and vacuous synths that all coalesce into a fuzzed out boom-bap." Ryan Dombal of Pitchfork Media called the synthesizer "sinister" and, according to Slant Magazine's Eric Henderson, it has Middle Eastern tones. Joey Guerra of the Houston Chronicle called the beats and vocal loops on "Tunnel Vision" reminiscent of Timbaland's past work with the late American singer Aaliyah. According to Sarah Dean of The Huffington Post, its beat resembles that on 50 Cent's 2007 single "Ayo Technology" (also featuring Timberlake).

"Tunnel Vision" features "thrilling" evolutions in production and arrangement complementing Timberlake's vocals,  and the song's unusual, abrupt changes unite it throughout. It borrows the "dark alley" rhythm of The 20/20 Experiences third track, "Don't Hold the Wall"; Timberlake sings in his lower register, with an "exciting" upward arpeggio. Timbaland uses the singer's voice as a "flexible instrument to enhance his tech savvy soundscape", constructing "layers of production elements into towers of sonic force". Lauren Martin of Fact called the song the start of Timbaland's "Bollywood influenced 'Indian Flute' era" and a tease; Timberlake's voice is redistributed, with wider range and suspense.

The song's lyrics describe Timberlake's tunnel vision of his love interest, with several voyeuristic references. The singer professes his love: "I look around and everything I see is beautiful, because all I see is you." According to The Huffington Posts Dean, Timberlake is in happier state of mind than on his 2002 song "Cry Me a River" or his 2007 single "What Goes Around... Comes Around". However, his lyrics have an obsessive quality: "A million people in a crowded room, but my camera lens is only set to zoom and it all becomes so clear." Mellisa Maerz of Entertainment Weekly wrote that on "Tunnel Vision", Timberlake is lyrically  "playing the rom-com director": "Just like a movie shoot, I’m zoomin’ in on you as we ride off into the sun." According to Mikael Wood of the Los Angeles Times, Timberlake uses references to "cameras and reflective surfaces" to reflect on the "changing nature of celebrity".

 Critical reception 
Consequence of Sound's Sarah H. Grant wrote that "Tunnel Vision" and "Don't Hold the Wall" were the album's highlights, similar to Timberlake's best work with 'NSYNC. Clyde Erwin Barretto of Prefix Magazine praised its production, which he felt excited listeners. The Huffington Posts Sarah Dean called "Tunnel Vision" her favorite track on the album. Jordan Sargent of Spin wrote that with the song, Timbaland proved that he could still produce otherworldly beats. In The Guardian, Kitty Empire wrote that Timbaland rejuvenated his production talents and "Kanye-calibre ambition".

In a less-enthusiastic review, Brad Stern of MTV Buzzworthy dismissed "Tunnel Vision" as "the album's most tediously grating moment". Allan Raible of ABC News  praised the track's beat, but thought it would fit better on a song with fewer "tired 'loverman' clichés." Fact magazine's Lauren Martin described "Tunnel Vision" and "Don't Hold the Wall" as "two rousing, if mildly deja vu inducing, efforts." Jed Gottlieb of the Boston Herald said that the song's "electro bump" would have been innovative if it had been released a year earlier.

 Chart performance 
"Tunnel Vision" sold well digitally after the release of The 20/20 Experience, charting in several countries. The week of March 17, 2013, it debuted on the South Korean Gaon International Chart at number 27 with 6,670 digital copies sold. Although it did not reach the Billboard Hot 100 in the United States, "Tunnel Vision" peaked at number 11 on the Bubbling Under Hot 100 singles chart and peaked at number 40 on the Billboard  Hot R&B/Hip-Hop Songs chart. After its release as a single, the song debuted and peaked at number 75 on the Irish Singles Chart. The week of July 20, "Tunnel Vision" debuted at number 64 on the UK Singles Chart. Its chart position fluctuated for three weeks, peaking at number 61 on August 10. The song was most successful on the UK R&B Singles Chart, where it debuted at number 21 and peaked at number eight by the week of August 10.

 Music video 

 Conception and fashion 

"Tunnel Vision"'s music video premiered on July 3, 2013 on Timberlake's Vevo  YouTube channel. The singer tweeted, "Check out the new video for Tunnel Vision and be ready...it's explicit. -teamJT". The video was directed by Jonathan Craven, Simon McLoughlin and Jeff Nicholas, with a cameo appearance by Timbaland. Craven and Nathan Scherrer produced the video for the Uprising Creative. Its director of photography was Sing Howe Yam, and Jacquelyn London edited the video for Sunset Edit.

The seven-minute video features Timberlake and Timbaland gazing at three nude women; according to Jason Lipshutz of Billboard, the women are wearing flesh-colored G-strings. In some shots, Timberlake's face is projected onto the women's bodies. Jordan Sargent of Spin called the set pieces where projections of Timberlake interact with the nude dancers "a fractured dynamic that mirrors 'Tunnel Vision' itself".

Cinya Burton of E! wrote about Timberlake's video wardrobe, "Apparently when Justin Timberlake isn't in his now-signature suit and tie getup, he's donning AllSaints." The singer wore two head-to-toe ensembles by the brand. The first was a gray Baxley V-neck T-shirt layered under a white Redono half-sleeved shirt, with casual Charge Chino pants. The second, a darker combination worn while he dances against a lighter background, was a black Resident Crew T-shirt, dark gray Pipe Chino pants, a Duncan denim shirt and black Trap boots. According to Burton, "While his ensembles are both dapper", the nude models in the video attracted more attention.

 Critical response and ban 

Critics have called the video NSFW, comparing it to the 2013 video for "Blurred Lines" by Robin Thicke with Pharrell Williams and T.I. In an interview with Capital FM, Thicke responded to a question about the videos' similarity: "No comment. I'll let you do all the talking. It's a subject that has no good ending." Fact magazine called the video's concept simple, and said its production team was unconcerned. According to Spins Jordan Sargent, "Like his new album The 20/20 Experience, in which half the songs run longer than seven minutes, the 'Tunnel Vision' video is self-consciously artistic and mature. But the video is also at times effective, particularly when the editing gets choppier during the bridge."

About the nude women in the video, an MTV UK reviewer said that Timberlake drew on Thicke's video. According to Tamar Anitai of MTV Buzzworthy, Timberlake wanted to live his life and celebrate his album's success: "Oh, come on! Don't complain. You bitched and moaned endlessly when Justin Timberlake stopped making music for six years, so don't get all Veruca Salty when he comes back with boobs to spare and boobs to share."

In her review, Rachel Maresca of the New York Daily News wrote that Timberlake slurred some of the song's explicit lyrics in the video. According to Kathy McCabe of News Corp Australia, Timberlake escalated the pop-porn movement with the video: "With mummy blogger outrage over Robin Thicke's exploitation of topless women for his Blurred Lines video – and its questionable lyrics – still raging, Timberlake has gone even further in his clip". McCabe wrote that male pop singers have been influenced by Rihanna and Katy Perry, who have "stripped down in the name of a hit. Or art. Or freedom of expression, depending on the press release spin". Clashs Robin Murray wrote that pop music has lacked raunchiness and sex appeal for some time, and Timberlake's return was needed: "Lavish, lush and 21st century in a direct, shocking fashion, the video finds Justin Timberlake on perfect preening form."

After the video's release it was banned from YouTube with a message saying, "This video has been removed as a violation of YouTube's policy on nudity or sexual content". The website quickly restored the video with a content warning and the requirement that viewers sign in (to verify their age). Although a YouTube representative declined to comment on individual videos, he issued a statement: "While our guidelines generally prohibit nudity, we make exceptions when it is presented in an educational, documentary or artistic context, and take care to add appropriate warnings and age restrictions".

 Live performances 
Timberlake first performed "Tunnel Vision" at the Phoenix Park concert in Dublin, Ireland, as part of a set list which included "Cry Me a River", "SexyBack" and "My Love". In a review of the concert, John Balfe of entertainment.ie wrote: "Even the album's more well-known songs like 'Tunnel Vision', 'Mirrors' and 'Suit & Tie' don't yet have the same weight in the setlist as some of JT's more established hits and it was songs like 'SexyBack' that really got the 40,000 strong crowd to move". On July 12 Timberlake appeared on the main stage at the Queen Elizabeth Olympic Park in Stratford, London as part of the Wireless Festival, performing "Tunnel Vision" and other songs dressed in black and wearing a black fedora. The song was on the set lists of Timberlake's 2013 Legends of the Summer Stadium Tour with rapper Jay-Z and his fifth worldwide tour, the 2013–15 20/20 Experience World Tour.

 Track listing 
"Tunnel Vision" (radio edit) — 4:45
"Tunnel Vision" — 6:46

 Credits and personnel 
Adapted from The 20/20 Experience album liner notes.Recording locationVocals recorded and mixed at Larrabee Studios, North Hollywood, CaliforniaPersonnelTimothy "Timbaland" Mosley – Producer, songwriter
Justin Timberlake – Mixer, producer, songwriter, vocal producer, vocal arranger
Jerome "J-Roc" Harmon – Keyboards, producer, songwriter
James Fauntleroy – Songwriter
Chris Godbey – Engineer, mixer
Jimmy Douglass – Mixer
Alejandro Baima – Assistant engineer
Elliot Ives – GuitarVideo credits'''
Jonathan Craven – Director, producer
Simon McLoughlin – Director
Jeff Nicholas – Director
Nathan Scherrer – Producer
The Uprising Creative – Production company
Sing Howe Yam – Director of photography
Jacquelyn London – Editor
Sunset Edit – Editing company

Charts

Release history

References

External links 

2013 singles
Justin Timberlake songs
Songs written by Timbaland
Songs written by Justin Timberlake
Songs written by Jerome "J-Roc" Harmon
Songs written by James Fauntleroy
Song recordings produced by Timbaland
Song recordings produced by Justin Timberlake
Song recordings produced by Jerome "J-Roc" Harmon
2013 songs
RCA Records singles